Carole Caldwell Graebner (née Caldwell; June 24, 1943 – November 19, 2008) was an American tennis player. According to Lance Tingay of The Daily Telegraph and the Daily Mail, Graebner was ranked in the world top 10 in 1964 and 1965, reaching a career high of World No. 4 in these rankings in 1964. Graebner was included in the year-end top 10 rankings issued by the United States Lawn Tennis Association from 1961 through 1965 and in 1967. She was the third-ranked U.S. player in 1964 and 1965. She was ranked U.S. No. 1 in doubles in 1963.

Career summary
Graebner paired with Nancy Richey to win doubles titles at the U.S. National Championships in 1965 (defeating Billie Jean King and Karen Hantze Susman in the final) and the Australian Championships in 1966 (defeating Margaret Court and Lesley Turner Bowrey in the final).

Graebner lost to Maria Bueno in the singles final of the 1964 U.S. Championships.

Graebner won the doubles title at the U.S. Women's Clay Court Championships in 1964 and 1965. In the singles event, she was a runner-up in 1962 and 1964 to Donna Floyd and Nancy Richey respectively.

In 1961 at the tournament in Cincinnati, Caldwell won the doubles title with Cathie Gagel and lost the singles final to Peachy Kellmeyer.

Caldwell won the Pacific Southwest singles title in 1962 and 1965 and won a gold medal in doubles at the 1963 Pan American Games.

Graebner was on the first U.S. Federation Cup team and attended California State University, Los Angeles.

After her playing career ended, Graebner was a radio and television commentator and a vice president with Tennis Week magazine.  She also served in sales and administration with Sports Investors, Inc.

Graebner was the chairthe Fed Cup Committee and vice chair of the Wightman Cup Committee.

Awards and honors
She was the recipient of the USTA Service Bowl Award in 1989 and the Sarah Palfrey Danzig Award in 1991. She was named Eastern Tennis Association Woman of the Year in 1989. In 1997, she was inducted into the ITA Women's Collegiate Tennis Hall of Fame.

Personal
Caldwell was born in Pittsburgh, Pennsylvania and grew up in Santa Monica, California. On July 11, 1964, she married American tennis star Clark Graebner. They had two children, a daughter Cameron and a son Clark. The couple separated in 1975 but never divorced.

Graebner died of cancer in New York City on November 19, 2008, aged 65.

Grand Slam finals

Singles: 1 (1 runner-up)

Doubles: 2 (2 titles)

Grand Slam singles tournament timeline

See also
 Performance timelines for all female tennis players who reached at least one Grand Slam final

References

External links
 
 

1943 births
2008 deaths
American female tennis players
Australian Championships (tennis) champions
Deaths from cancer in New York (state)
California State University, Los Angeles alumni
United States National champions (tennis)
Tennis players from Santa Monica, California
Tennis players from Pittsburgh
Grand Slam (tennis) champions in women's doubles
Pan American Games medalists in tennis
Pan American Games gold medalists for the United States
Tennis players at the 1963 Pan American Games
20th-century American women
21st-century American women
Medalists at the 1963 Pan American Games